Frank Bevis (1907–2003) was a British film producer and production manager.

Selected filmography
 The Scarlet Web (1954)
 The Weapon (1956)
 Night of the Demon (1957)
 Death Over My Shoulder (1958)
 Nudist Paradise (1958)
 The Iron Maiden (1962)
 Nurse on Wheels (1963)
 Carry On Cabby (1963)
 Carry on Cleo (1964)
 Carry On Spying (1964)
 Carry On Jack (1964)
 Carry On Cowboy (1965)
 The Big Job (1965)
 Carry on Screaming! (1966)
 The Limbo Line (1968)
 Rosie Dixon - Night Nurse (1978)
 The Thirty Nine Steps (1978)

References

Bibliography 
 Fujiwara, Chris. Jacques Tourneur: The Cinema of Nightfall. McFarland, 1998.

External links 
 

1907 births
2003 deaths
British film producers
People from Gosport